Sphenomorphus neuhaussi  is a species of skink. It is endemic to New Guinea and occurs in Madang, Morobe, Chimbu, and Eastern Highland Provinces of Papua New Guinea.

References

neuhaussi
Skinks of New Guinea
Reptiles of Papua New Guinea
Endemic fauna of New Guinea
Endemic fauna of Papua New Guinea
Reptiles described in 1911
Taxa named by Theodor Vogt